Slavicisation or Slavicization, is the acculturation of something Slavic into a non-Slavic culture, cuisine, region, or nation. To a lesser degree, it also means acculturation or adoption of something non-Slavic into Slavic culture or terms. The process can either be voluntary or applied through varying degrees of pressure.

The term can also refer to the historical Slavic migrations to the Balkans which gradually Slavicized large areas previously inhabited by other ethnic peoples.

After historic ethnogenesis and distinct nationalisation, ten main subsets of the process apply in modern times:

 Belarusization
 Bosniakisation
 Bulgarisation
 Croatisation
 Czechization
 Polonization
 Russification
 Serbianisation
 Slovakization
 Ukrainization
Macedonization

See also
 Hellenization
 Pan-Slavism

Cultural assimilation